Kevin Ward is a British geographer and academic. Since 2007, he has been Professor of Human Geography at the University of Manchester.

Education and career 
Ward graduated from Middlesex University with a BA in economics and geography in 1991. The following year, he completed an MA in transport economics at the University of Leeds. He was awarded a second MA (in social research methods) by the University of Manchester in 1995, where he also carried out doctoral studies supported by an ESRC studentship; his PhD was awarded in 1998.

Between 1992 and 1994, Ward was a research assistant at the University of Birmingham's Department of Economics. From 1997 to 2000, he was a research associate at the University of Manchester, where he was appointed Lecturer in Human Geography in 2000. He was promoted to a senior lectureship in 2003 and to a readership in 2005, before being appointed Professor of Human Geography in 2007.

Publications 

 (Co-authored with Huw Beynon, Damian Grimshaw, and Jill Rubery) Managing Employment Change: The Realities of Working in Britain (Oxford University Press, 2002).
 (Co-authored with Mike Savage and Alan Warde) Urban Sociology, Modernity and Capitalism (Sage, 2002).
 (Edited with Jamie Peck) City of Revolution: Restructuring Manchester (Manchester University Press, 2002).
 (Co-authored with Noel Castree, Neil M. Coe, and Michael Samers), Spaces of Work: Global Capitalism and the Geographies of Labour (Sage, 2004).
 (Edited with Kim England) Neoliberalization: States, Networks, Peoples (Wiley, 2007).
 Researching the City: A Guide for Students (Sage, 2012).

References 

Living people
British geographers
Human geographers
Alumni of Middlesex University
Alumni of the University of Leeds
Alumni of the University of Manchester
Academics of the University of Manchester
Year of birth missing (living people)